is an apostolic constitution in the form of a papal bull promulgated by Pope Innocent X in 1653 which condemned five propositions said to have been found in Cornelius Jansen's Augustinus as heretical.

"Some of God's commandments are impossible to just men who wish and strive to keep them, considering the powers they actually have; the grace by which these precepts may become possible is also wanting to them."
"In the state of fallen nature no one ever resists interior grace."
"In order to merit or demerit, in the state of fallen nature, we must be free from all external constraint, but not from interior necessity."
"The Semi-Pelagians admitted the necessity of interior preventing grace for all acts, even for the beginning of faith; but they fell into heresy in pretending that this grace is such that man may either follow or resist it."
"It is Semi-Pelagian to say that Christ died or shed His blood for all men."

Bernard Otten explained, in A manual of the history of dogmas, that the first four of these propositions are absolutely condemned as heretical; while the fifth is condemned as heretical when taken in the sense that Christ died only for the predestined.

See also
Formulary controversy
Ad sanctam beati Petri sedem – Defined the signification of propositions said to have been found in Augustinus
Regiminis Apostolici – Defined the Formula of Submission for the Jansenists

Notes

Citations

References

Apostolic constitutions
Documents of Pope Innocent X
Jansenism
1653 works
17th-century papal bulls
Religion in the Ancien Régime
1653 in Christianity